Cactus Cooler is an orange–pineapple flavored soft drink sold primarily in Southern California and the surrounding Southwestern United States. Distinguished by its orange, yellow, and green label with saguaro cacti, the soda is part of Keurig Dr Pepper and was previously distributed under the Canada Dry brand. The drink was inspired by fictional character Fred Flintstone's favorite drink, Cactus Coola.

See also 
 Jupiña: a pineapple soda
 Lilt: a pineapple-grapefruit soda

References 

Arizona culture
Fruit sodas
Keurig Dr Pepper brands
Orange sodas
Pineapples